Kelsey Smith (born 11 August 1994) is a New Zealand field hockey player who plays for the national team.

Smith was born on 11 August 1994 in Nelson. She attended Waimea College and now studies tourism management at Victoria University in Wellington. She played her first game for the national team in 2015 against Argentina. In July 2016, she was confirmed for New Zealand's Olympic team.

As well as appearing in the senior national team, Smith appeared for the Junior Black Sticks in 2015 during an Invitational Tournament in Breda.

References

External links
 

1994 births
Living people
People educated at Waimea College
New Zealand female field hockey players
Field hockey players at the 2016 Summer Olympics
Sportspeople from Nelson, New Zealand
Victoria University of Wellington alumni
Olympic field hockey players of New Zealand
Commonwealth Games gold medallists for New Zealand
Field hockey players at the 2018 Commonwealth Games
Commonwealth Games medallists in field hockey
Female field hockey forwards
Field hockey players at the 2020 Summer Olympics
Medallists at the 2018 Commonwealth Games